Stonkus is a Lithuanian language family name. It may refer to:

Stasys Stonkus, Lithuanian basketball player
Ramūnas Stonkus (born 1970), Lithuanian footballer

Lithuanian-language surnames